Sandermosen Station is a formerly staffed station on the Gjøvik Line located in Maridalen, Oslo, Norway. The station which formerly had its own station building is located a little under 16 km from Oslo Central Station between Kjelsås Station and Snippen Station and was opened in 1909. It was closed on 11 June 2006. Since its closure Snippen is the nearest station. The area was used as a loading zone as early as 1900, two years prior to the opening of the Gjøvik Line. Today the station and the station building is a juncture for cultural activities in the area. This cultural arena is promoted by kulturPUNKTET Sandermosen stasjon. A sculpture park is situated next to the track.

In 1921, Dano-Norwegian author Aksel Sandemose took his new surname from Sandermosen which is where his mother had been born.

References

Other Sources 
  Kulturarenaen på Sandermosen ("cultural arena at Sandermosen")

Railway stations in Oslo
Railway stations on the Gjøvik Line
Disused railway stations in Norway
Railway stations opened in 1909
Railway stations closed in 2006
1909 establishments in Norway
2006 disestablishments in Norway
Maridalen